Woodend is a village near Egremont, Cumbria, England.

The village had a station on the Whitehaven, Cleator and Egremont Railway but it closed in 1947.

Longlands Lake is located very near to this small village and Clint's quarry resides here.

Villages in Cumbria
Egremont, Cumbria